Björnstjerna is a surname. Notable people with the surname include:

Carl Björnstjerna (1886–1982), Swedish horse rider
Magnus Björnstjerna (1779–1847), Swedish general
Oscar Björnstjerna (1819–1905), Swedish diplomat and politician

See also
Wallenberg family

Swedish-language surnames